The following is a list of squads for each nation competing in football at the 2018 Central American and Caribbean Games in Barranquilla.

Group A

Colombia
Head coach: Nelson Abadía

Costa Rica
Head coach: Amelia Valverde.

Jamaica
Head coach: Hue Menzies

Yazmeen Jamieson replaced Sydney Schneider.

Venezuela
Head coach: José Catoya

Group B

Haiti

Mexico
Head coach: Roberto Medina

Nicaragua
Head coach: Elna Dixon.

Trinidad and Tobago
Head coach: Jamaal Shabazz

References

Women
2018